Valimo is the Finnish word for foundry or ironworks.

It is also the name for:
 a bar and cafe in Suomenlinna in Helsinki
 Valimo railway station on Helsinki's commuter railway network
 An IT company, Valimo Wireless which specialises in Mobile Identity